The ALCO RSC-2 was a diesel-electric locomotive that rode on three-axle trucks, having an A1A-A1A wheel arrangement.

91 locomotives were produced — Used in much the same manner as its four-axle counterpart, the ALCO RS-2, though the wheel arrangement lowered the axle load for operation on light rail such as are found on branch lines.

The Milwaukee Road was the first railroad to take delivery of the RSC-2, initially assigning them to their Valley Division (headquartered near Wausau, Wisconsin) in November 1946. This was done in order to study the effects of an all-diesel roster (i.e. no steam locomotives available as a backup). The experiment was deemed a success and soon all steam locomotives were gone from the Valley Division. RSC-2s would faithfully serve the Milwaukee Road for many years, until being replaced in turn by the EMD SDL39.

ALCO also exported these units to the state railway of Portugal, where Portuguese Railways (CP) designated them Série 1500. The last units in Portugal served in regular passenger service into the first decade of the 21st century. Of these, five are still running today, 70 years after their arrival (one is a museum locomotive, while the other four are owned by track maintenance companies). 
Five units were exported to the Algerian National Railways where they were used in passenger train service.

Original Buyers

References
 

A1A-A1A locomotives
RSC-2
Diesel-electric locomotives of the United States
Railway locomotives introduced in 1946
Standard gauge locomotives of the United States
5 ft 6 in gauge locomotives
Standard gauge locomotives of Algeria
Diesel-electric locomotives of Portugal
Diesel-electric locomotives of Algeria